Ganges is a river in India.

Ganges may also refer to:

Places
 Ganges, Hérault, a commune in the Hérault département in France
 Ganges, British Columbia, a town on Saltspring Island in the province of British Columbia in Canada
 Ganges, Ohio, a community in the United States
 Ganges Township, Michigan, in the United States
 Ganges Bank, a wholly submerged atoll structure in Indian Ocean southwest of the Chagos Archipelago
 Ganges Chasma, a deep canyon at the eastern end of the vast Valles Marineris system on Mars
 River Ganges is another name for Ping Yuen River in Hong Kong

Ships

Nourse Line ships
 , the first Nourse Line ship (1861–1881) to bear the name
 , the second Nourse Line ship (1882–1917) to bear the name
 , the third Nourse Line ship to be named Ganges

Warships
 , a class of six 74-gun third rates in the British Royal Navy
 , several ships of the British Royal Navy
 , a merchant vessel that the US converted to a man-of-war in the United States Navy during the Quasi-War with France

Other ships
 , several ships
 , several ships
 , a cargo ship in service 1954–1959
 USS Ganges (NCC-72454), a fictional vessel in the series Star Trek: Deep Space 9

Other
 Ganges (comics)
 Ganges (TV series)

See also
 Ganga (disambiguation)